is a Shinto shrine in Kunitachi, Tokyo, Japan.

History
Located next to the Kōshū Kaidō highway, Yabo Tenman-gū claims to be the oldest Shinto shrine in the Kantō region dedicated to Tenjin, the deified Sugawara no Michizane, having been built in 903 AD by Michizane's third son.

See also
 Yushima Tenman-gū

References

External links 
 Yabo Tenman-gū
 

903 establishments
Shinto shrines in Tokyo
Kunitachi, Tokyo
10th-century establishments in Japan
Sugawara no Michizane
Tenjin faith